Rodrigo José Bronzatti (born 6 December 1986) is a Brazilian professional footballer who plays as an centre-back for Nicaraguan club Real Estelí.

Career statistics

References

External links

1986 births
Living people
Association football defenders
Brazilian footballers
People from Ijuí
Brazilian expatriate footballers
Expatriate footballers in Mexico
Brazilian expatriate sportspeople in Mexico
Expatriate footballers in Nicaragua
Brazilian expatriate sportspeople in Nicaragua
Esporte Clube São Luiz players
Associação Chapecoense de Futebol players
Club Celaya footballers
Tecos F.C. footballers
Dorados de Sinaloa footballers
Clube Atlético Penapolense players
Sociedade Esportiva e Recreativa Caxias do Sul players
FC Cascavel players
Sociedade Esportiva do Gama players
Potros UAEM footballers
Real Estelí F.C. players
Campeonato Brasileiro Série C players
Ascenso MX players
Campeonato Paranaense players
Nicaraguan Primera División players
Sportspeople from Rio Grande do Sul
Brazilian people of Italian descent